Athletes from the Islamic Republic of Iran competed at the 1988 Summer Paralympics in Seoul, South Korea.

Competitors

Medal summary

Medal table

Medalists

Results by event

Athletics

Men

Goalball

Men

Powerlifting

Men

Volleyball

Men's sitting

References
International Paralympic Committee

Nations at the 1988 Summer Paralympics
1988
Paralympics